Those Who Walk Away (1967) is a psychological thriller novel by Patricia Highsmith. It was the twelfth of her 22 novels.

Synopsis
When Ray Garrett's new wife kills herself on their honeymoon, he persuades the initially suspicious Rome police that he's innocent of any wrongdoing over the death. However, his father-in-law, the brutish Ed Coleman, is convinced Ray led to her death and shoots Ray, leaving him for dead. He survives and, desperate to prove himself, follows Coleman to Venice, the husband and father bound together by love and guilt, with Coleman still seeking justice and Garrett a clear conscience.

Reviews

It has been called Highsmith's "masterpiece".

References

1967 American novels
Novels by Patricia Highsmith
Novels set in Rome
Novels set in Venice
Doubleday (publisher) books